The following is a list of characters that first appeared in the British soap opera Emmerdale in 2006, by order of first appearance. All characters were introduced by the soap's executive producer, Keith Richardson.

Samson Dingle

Samson Dingle, played by Sam Hall, is the son of Sam (James Hooton) and Alice Dingle (Ursula Holden-Gill). He has appeared since January 2006. The character has also been played by other actors in the past, one being Ben Shooter, who was controversially sacked in 2008 for 'crying on set'. Following this, Shooter's mother Emma slammed producer Anita Turner and claimed that he was treated like a 'prop' and that he had to film 'horrifying' scenes.
 
After discovering she is pregnant, Alice falls ill with cancer. She is advised to terminate the pregnancy to start chemotherapy immediately, but she refuses to abort. She gives birth prematurely via a c-section and her son is named Samson. After stopping her chemotherapy because it is not working, Alice dies. After Alice's death, Sam vows to bring up Samson on his own and moves into his own cottage. However, he finds it difficult to cope and someone calls social services. Samson is knocked down by Val Pollard (Charlie Hardwick) in her jeep. He soon recovers, but Sam goes on the run with Samson because he is worried he will be taken away from him. An arrangement is later made and Sam is allowed to keep Samson. He later moves back in with Sam and the Dingle family.

Vonda Lockhart

Vonda Lockhart (als Hope) is Bob Hope's (Tony Audenshaw) ex-wife. She appeared in 2006 and 2007.

Bob and Vonda, a show dancer in Las Vegas, met in 1994 on a cruise and drunkenly got married aboard the ship. They divorced after the cruise. Unknown to Bob, Vonda fell pregnant and gave birth to Roxy (Chloe Procter), his fifth child.

In 2006, when Bob is planning to remarry Viv (Deena Payne) she wants to have all of his children there. They find out about Roxy, and she and Vonda come to the village for the wedding. In 2007, Vonda and Roxy return to the village when the former is doing a tour of Northern England decides that Roxy should spend some time with Bob.

Roxy Lockhart

Roxy Lockhart  is the daughter of Bob Hope (Tony Audenshaw). She appeared in 2006 and 2007.

Bob does not know of Roxy's existence until near the time of his second marriage to Viv (Deena Payne) when Viv wants to have all his children there. He had married Roxy's mother Vonda (Lorelei King) when they were drunk on a cruise and they got a quick divorce. Vonda later gave birth without Bob knowing. Vonda and Roxy only stay for Bob's wedding. Roxy has done many beauty pageants back home in America.

The following year, Vonda is employed to tour in the North of England, and decides that Bob and Roxy should spend some time together while she is working. However, Bob spends too much time with his new born twins, Cathy (Gabrielle Dowling) and Heath (Sebastian Dowling), and forgets to feed Roxy. When he does, she begins choking and Jimmy King (Nick Miles) performs the Heimlich Manoeuvre on Roxy and saves her. Vonda arrives after this and accuses Bob of being a neglectful father. They leave shortly after and Bob gives Roxy a bracelet that belonged to his late daughter, Roxy's half-sister Dawn (Julia Mallam). Roxy returns to the village for Cathy and Heath's christening and is asked to be Cathy's godmother. She is annoyed, however, that she is not the only godmother and after Bob flees the church, she tells him he is a loser. Vonda and Roxy then leave Emmerdale. Bob visits Roxy in 2008 as the two have since made up.

Jamie Hope

Owen Hartbourne

Owen Hartbourne is the grandson of Pearl Ladderbanks (Meg Johnson). He appeared in 2006 and 2007.

Owen - who lives in Hong Kong - arrives in the village looking for his father, Frank Bernard (Rob Parry). Pearl lies and tells him he is dead. However, when Owen wants to visit his grave, Pearl has to tell him that is father is alive but has been in prison for rape. Owen returns in May 2007 to help Pearl deal with the death of Len Reynolds (Peter Martin).

Alasdair Sinclair

Alasdair Charles Sinclair is Grayson Sinclair's (Christopher Villiers) brother. He appeared in 2006 and 2008.

Alasdair first appears in early 2006 as the fiancé of Sadie King (Patsy Kensit). His mother, Rosemary (Linda Thorson), tries to persuade him not to marry her but to no avail. On the wedding day, Sadie's ex-brother-in-law, Matthew King (Matt Healy) gatecrashes the wedding. The wedding goes ahead, but Sadie soon leaves Alasdair for Matthew. Alasdair returns to the village several times, including for his mother's engagement to Tom King (Kenneth Farrington) but returns to Dubai for work. On New Year's Day 2008, he returns for Rosemary's funeral. This is Alasdair's last appearance.

Grayson Sinclair

Perdita Hyde-Sinclair

Rosemary King

Beryl and Barney Chugspoke

Beryl and Barney Chugspoke, played by Georgina Hale and David Huw Thomas, respectively made their first appearance on 9 June 2006. The Chugspokes' casting was announced a month before their debut. The duo were originally conceived as  a married couple but were referred to as siblings when their first episode aired. Hale and Edwards were contracted for eight episodes.  A writer from Inside Soap described the Chugspokes as a "pair of wasters"

Barney and Beryl arrive in Emmerdale after their campervan breaks down outside of Wishing Well Cottage and ask Lisa Dingle (Jane Cox) to fix it. However, the pair soon begin to outstay their welcome with their behaviour and ingratitude. Shadrach Dingle (Andy Devine) devises a plan to get rid of them by faking a hurt leg when they go out truffle hunting and frames them for stealing Belle's pet pig, Petal. A row ensues between Lisa and Beryl and the Chugspokes are ordered to leave.

Ray Stead

Ray Stead is the owner of a chain of bookmakers. In June 2006, Pearl Ladderbanks, an old friend of his, visits one of his shops. After a horse she bets on wins, Ray convinces her to place further bets, it leaves her in a lot of debt. A few days later, Ray turns up in the village to see Pearl, but she isn't in and is greeted by her partner Len Reynolds. Ray tells Len that Pearl owes him £600, which Len offers to pay, and says that he has a couple of weeks to pay.

A year later, Marlon Dingle visits another of Ray's shops when he decides to secretly bet all £3,000 he received from the sale of building materials to win £20,000 he and his wife Donna need for a deposit. Marlon's horse wins, but Ray rips him off by eating the betting slip, leaving him with nothing. Marlon tells his furious brother Eli about the debacle. Marlon vows to get the money back and Eli decides to help him out, as long as Marlon follows his plan. Marlon and Eli turn up to do the job at the bookies in a stolen car, but Marlon is horrified when Eli reveals that he's brought a gun. Eli threatens Ray and is almost successful when a customer walks in and a struggle ensures. Marlon walks in to see Eli threatening Ray and a customer with the gun and he tries to grab the weapon. But the gun goes off and Marlon is left in a pool of blood, as he urges Eli to run for the door. Ray and the customer ring for an ambulance and Marlon is rushed to hospital. A few days later, Ray, who is grateful to Marlon for preventing the robbery and feeling guilty, turns up at the hospital to give him his winnings.

Dr Josephine Abbott

Dr Josephine Abbott, played by Kate Maravan, is a local GP who first appeared in 2006, introduced by then-series producer, Kathleen Beedles. She continues to appear in the show, whenever a character visits her at her surgery, which is presumably in Hotton. She first appears when Jasmine Thomas visits her after she is too unwell to attend the funeral of Dawn Woods. Dr Abbott tells Jasmine that she is pregnant, but Jasmine doesn't believe it and leaves. Jasmine returns the following day and tells Dr Abbott that she had unprotected sex, and Dr Abbott advises Jasmine to book herself into an STD clinic as a precaution. Later, she visits a very weak Alice Dingle and tells Alice that she would like to admit her to hospital, but Alice doesn't want to.

In 2013, her appearances have included when Belle Dingle (Eden Taylor-Draper) was taken by her mother, Lisa (Jane Cox) to discuss contraception with Dr. Abbott, and the occasions when Rhona Goskirk (Zoe Henry) visits her in connection with her back injury. Viewers have seen Rhona becoming addicted to her painkillers and getting frustrated with Dr. Abbott for lowering her dosage.

Susie Carter

Susie Carter was a servant of Rosemary Sinclair (Linda Thorson) in Oakwell Hall. Susie knew that Rosemary was broke. Rosemary attempted to recruit Susie to Home Farm, but there was Pearl Ladderbanks (Meg Johnson). Susie is Polish and she was very loyal to Rosemary. Susie left the village in December 2006.

Charles Vaughan

Charles Vaughan is a friend of Tom King (Ken Farrington) and the superintendent of Hotten police station. He appeared from 2006 to 2009.

Vaughan first appears when his old friend Tom is kidnapped by Cain Dingle (Jeff Hordley) and Sadie King (Patsy Kensit). Tom later chooses Vaughan as his best man for his Christmas Day wedding to Rosemary Sinclair (Linda Thorson). Tom is murdered on his wedding day and after his death Vaughan becomes close to Tom's widow Rosemary. Tom's son, Matthew King (Matt Healy) makes an unofficial complaint to DCI Grace Barraclough (Glynis Barber), about their closeness. Barraclough then speaks to Vaughan, who realises that he should have a professional relationship only with Rosemary.

After this investigation, Vaughan continues to appear as the senior police officer. He gets involved in 2008 when Donna Windsor-Dingle (Verity Rushworth) makes a complaint about PC Shane Doyle (Paul McEwan). He advises Donna not to make a formal complaint as it might affect her career. On 30 December 2008, Shane's body is found in a local lake. Early the following month, he goes to Matthew's funeral.

Eli Dingle

David Brown

David Brown is an estate agent. He appeared in 2006.

David Brown is an estate agent who is in the Kings River Showhome when it collapses. He is standing near Noreen Bell (Jenny Tomasin) when she opens a cupboard door and turns on a light, creating a spark which starts a series of explosions setting him on fire and the house collapses. After being retrieved from the house, David dies after paramedics fail to revive him. Noreen also dies.

Gilbert Duff

Gilbert Duff is the cousin of Noreen Bell (Jenny Tomasin). He appeared in 2006.

Gilbert attends Noreen's funeral, and later her will reading, where he receives her thimble collections while Val Lambert (Charlie Hardwick) inherits Noreen's money.

Peter Birch

Peter Birch is Lily Butterfield's (Anne Charleston) son. He appeared in 2006 and 2008.

For most of his life, he believed that Harold and Edna Birch (Shirley Stelfox) were his parents but Edna, blackmailed by Tom King, tells him in October 2006 that she and her husband unofficially adopted him as Lily (his birth mother and Edna's sister) was single and couldn't take care of him. Peter takes this very badly and has no contact with Edna afterwards. In September 2008, Peter reappears to visit Lily - without Edna's knowledge. He tells Lily that he is badly in debt but she is unable to help. However, weeks later she and her colleagues win a car worth £15,000. Her offers Peter her share, £3000, but he makes her feel guilty so she reluctantly gives Peter the ticket so he can claim the full £15,000. The missing ticket is soon noticed, and eventually Lily confesses to Edna what happened. Edna asks Peter to return the money, but he refuses, so Edna takes the money out of her savings so Lily can pay her colleagues back. She does not tell Lily that the money was hers, not Peter's.

Sandra Flaherty

Sandra Flaherty (also Livesy) made her first screen appearance on 3 February 2006. She was initially played by Christine Brennan and then Janet Bamford in 2008. She is the ex-wife of Gordon Livesy (Gerard Fletcher/Gary Mavers) and mother of Liv Flaherty (Isobel Steele) and stepmother of Aaron Livesy (Danny Webb/Danny Miller). When the character was reintroduced in 2016, the part was recast to Joanne Mitchell. Sandra has since been reintroduced for brief stints in 2021 and 2022.

She accompanies Gordon when he brings his son Aaron to Emmerdale to visit his mother, Gordon's ex-wife Chas Dingle (Lucy Pargeter). Sandra is pregnant and Aaron is unable to return home after being in contact with someone who had German measles. In 2008, Sandra appears after Aaron is arrested. Chas goes to see Gordon and sees that Sandra has a black eye. She initially believes that Gordon is responsible but he tells her that Aaron hit Sandra and refuses to take Aaron back. Seven years later, when Gordon comes back into Chas and Aaron's lives, he reveals his marriage to Sandra has broken down and he no longer has contact with his daughter, Liv. Two months later, Aaron and Robert Sugden (Ryan Hawley) track Sandra and Liv down to inform them that Gordon abused Aaron when he was a child. Sandra admits to Aaron that she knew about what Gordon did to him and kept quiet, causing Aaron to lose his temper and grab her by the arm. His violent altercation with Sandra is witnessed by Robert and Liv.

In March 2016,  Sandra comes to the village to collect Liv, only to find out Liv had been going to see Gordon. Sandra come face to face with Chas. Sandra blames Chas for getting Aaron in the mess he is. Sandra attempts to leave but Chas blocks her way. Sandra confesses to Chas that she did have suspicions of Aaron's. Sandra tells Chas that fourteen years earlier, she had taken Liv, then a baby, with her to her mother's house following an argument with Gordon. The next day, when she returned, she had discovered Aaron's wet pyjamas in the bin. Sandra had believed that Aaron had wet himself and Gordon had got angry with him for this. Unknown to her, Gordon had raped Aaron but she never knew at the time. Gordon got rid of Aaron's pyjamas after raping him. Sandra then reveals to Chas that the day before Aaron had left in 2008, she overheard Aaron and Gordon arguing in the bathroom and Aaron saying to Gordon "You can't do that to me anymore". Chas convinces Sandra to tell to give a statement to the police. After Gordon is found guilty of raping Aaron, Sandra makes plans to move to Dublin, but Liv is reluctant to go with her, as she wants to live with Aaron. After being convinced to let Liv stay with Aaron, Sandra leaves for Dublin.

Lily Butterfield

David Metcalfe

Jenny Albright

Jenny Albright is the friend of Victoria Sugden and Kayleigh Gibbs, played by Southward's close friends, Isabel Hodgins and Lily Jane Stead.

Jenny first appears when she, Victoria and Kayleigh hurl eggs at the Post Office window, distressing a heavily pregnant Viv Hope (Deena Payne) but they are chased off by Eli Dingle (Joseph Gilgun).

Jenny appears again when she, Kayleigh and Victoria went to a nightclub after a woman gave Victoria tickets to go there. They got dressed up and told Victoria's father Jack that they were going out. They did not stay long as they spotted Victoria's adoptive brother Andy and a lot of other Emmerdale residents at the club. As they were leaving, Andy's lodger, Jo Stiles (Roxanne Pallett), saw them and told them about the dodgy people in the club but promised not to tell Jack that they had been there.

Bridget Burgess

Bridget Burgess is Belle Dingle's (Eden Taylor-Draper) teacher. She appeared in 2006 and 2007. She was played by Eileen O'Brien, who later re-appeared in Emmerdale in early 2013 as Beattie Dixon.

Bridget first appears when she sends a letter to Belle's parents, Zak (Steve Halliwell) and Lisa Dingle (Jane Cox), asking to see them. Belle intercepts the letter and persuades her uncle Shadrach (Andy Devine) to be her father. However, when they meet, Shadrach realises that she and him used to be an item. He tries to restart their relationship, but she is not interested. Bridget soon discovers that Shadrach is not Belle's father and sets up a meeting with Zak and Lisa, and tells them Belle is having behavioural problems. Zak and Lisa declare that Belle will start to behave but when she removes a security block on the computers, Bridget and the head teacher want to suspend Belle. This leads to an argument with Zak, and he removes Belle from the school. Bridget tries on several occasions to persuade Zak to let her return, but he refuses.

Karen Williams

Detective Sergeant Karen Williams is a police officer. She has appeared from 2006 to 2007 and from 2008 to 2009.

DS Williams is first seen investigating the Christmas Day murder of Tom King (Ken Farrington) in 2006. The case against Tom's three sons Jimmy (Nick Miles), Matthew (Matt Healy) and Carl (Tom Lister) eventually collapses much to her frustration and she does not find out that Carl is the killer. Later in 2007, Williams investigates a fire at Tenant House started by Victoria Sugden (Isabel Hodgins) who confesses and Williams arrests and charges her. Andy Sugden (Kelvin Fletcher) then confesses to Williams that he had started a fire seven years earlier in which his adoptive mother Sarah Sugden (Alyson Spiro) was killed and Williams also arrests and charges him. Williams investigates the disappearance of Rosemary Sinclair (Linda Thorson) and arrests and charges Matthew with her murder but is forced to let him go when Rosemary is later found to have committed suicide in America. In March 2008, Williams arrests Viv Hope (Deena Payne) over her involvement in a children's charity fraud committed by Freddie Yorke (Keith Woodason). Although Viv claims that she removed the money she had put into the bogus charity when she realized what Freddie was doing, Williams believes that Viv was involved in the con as well and charges her. On 30 December 2008 she is called to a lake where a body has been found and she soon discovers it is the body of a colleague, PC Shane Doyle (Paul McEwan). She and DC Nick Henshall (Michael McKell) then lead the investigation into Shane's murder, and arrest and charge PC Ross Kirk (Samuel Anderson) with the murder but the case against him is later dropped. Later in January, Williams leads the search of the Dingles' house and arrests Eli Dingle (Joseph Gilgun) for Shane's murder. She and DC Henshall later arrive in the village to find Jasmine Thomas (Jenna-Louise Coleman) and Debbie Dingle (Charley Webb), who Eli revealed were Shane's killers. Jasmine runs away, but Debbie is arrested and later charged with murder. In early March, Jasmine returns and confesses to killing Shane in order to clear Debbie's name. Williams and Henshall interview her and she is later sentenced to four years imprisonment for manslaughter.

DCI Grace Barraclough

Grace Barraclough, portrayed by Glynis Barber, made her first appearance on 26 December 2006.

DCI Grace Barraclough first appeared with her colleague DCI Vikesh Dasari (Stephen Rahman-Hughes), as part of the storyline surrounding the death of Tom King (Ken Farrington). While investigating Tom's murder, she suspected Bob Hope (Tony Audenshaw), even more so after he confessed. However, it emerged that he had confessed to protect his son Jamie (Alex Carter). She later started dating Carl King (Tom Lister) secretly, as a honeytrap. Their relationship became serious, however if they were discovered, Grace could lose her job. She carried on with the relationship, but when Vikesh saw her with Carl he gave her an ultimatum; end the relationship or he would tell her boss Charles Vaughan (Richard Cole) and her career would be over. (Vaughan was already angry with Grace for failing to get a conviction on the King case, amongst other things). Knowing what she must do, Grace ended the affair, even though she still loved Carl.

After Grace ended the affair, Carl left the village, for a brief amount of time to get over Grace. When Carl returned however, he seduced Grace again. She tried again to end the relationship but when she learned that her mother had had a stroke, she regretted being so hard on Carl as he refused to be a shoulder to cry on. She stopped answering when he called; and later in the week, when Carl read about her mother's death in the paper, he resorted to waiting outside the police station and Grace's home in order to get her to speak to him. It finally worked, but she confessed that the first time they had had a drink together, she had followed him and was trying to trap him for information about the murder of Carl's father. Grace and Carl worked through their issues and their relationship was back on track. Grace died on 27 September after being hit by a lorry after Carl admitted to her that he had killed his father. Carl didn't attend her funeral but laid flowers at her grave later on. It was supposed that Matthew King (Matt Healy) had ordered her death.

DCI Vikesh Dasari

Detective Chief Inspector Vikesh Dasari is a local police officer. He appeared from 2006 to 2007.

Detective Inspector Dasari appears in the village, with his CID colleague DCI Grace Barraclough (Glynis Barber), following the death of Tom King (Ken Farrington). Barraclough is later taken off the case for getting too involved, and Dasari leads the investigation into Tom's murder. In July 2007, he is promoted to the rank of Detective Chief Inspector (DCI).

Other characters

References

2006
, Emmerdale